Legislative elections were held in Indonesia on 29 May 1997. There were three simultaneous elections in one because voters were electing members of two levels of regional government (provincial and regency levels) as well as the national-level People's Representative Council. This was to be the last election of  President Suharto's New Order regime, which collapsed a year later. Like the preceding New Order elections, it was won outright by the Golkar organization.

Background
The political and social environment during the 1997 legislative elections was substantially different than in previous elections. There was a widespread belief among the public that this election would be Suharto's last term as president. However, there was no clear successor to him or his New Order regime.

This led to many officials in the government demonstrating their loyalty to Suharto and to gain his favor by delivering a victory for Golkar. This led to what Professor of Politics and Government Cornelis Lay called "a shattering process of structural cheating."

Another factor in the election was the greater global focus on human rights in Indonesia. In 1993, pressure against the Suharto government resulted in formation of the National Human Rights Commission. The commission (which had an unusual degree of independence from the Suharto government) offered a channel for humans rights groups and organizations to focus international attention to human rights abuses in the country.

Participants

Indonesian law at the time only allowed three organisations to participate in elections - the United Development Party (PPP), the Indonesian Democratic Party (PDI) and Golkar (functional group), an organisation which started off as a confederation of NGOs, and was officially not a party.

Election campaign

The 27-day campaign ran from April 27 to May 23, with a quiet period of five days before polling day.

Media coverage

The mass media tended to favour "a particular election participant", for example Suara Karya newspaper only reported on Golkar campaign activities, and did not mention the PDI or PPP campaigns at all. On the other hand, the daily Media Indonesia was rather more balanced, but overall, Golkar campaign speakers received far more coverage.

In the later stages of the campaign, media coverage was dominated by reports of campaign violence. Suara Karya in particular reported three times as many violent incidents involving the PPP than any other paper.

Campaign issues

Not a single election participant started the campaign by announcing or focusing on its main themes, therefore the public really had no idea what they were offering. The campaign was dominated by "sloganistic issues" with very little substance. For example, all three election participants promised to address problems such as poverty and corruption, but none actually said how they would do this. In fact, Kristiadi says that the only difference between this campaign and the previous one in 1992 was that there was less use of verses from the Koran to try and attract support.

The "Mega-Bintang Phenomenon"

Following the government's forced replacement of PDI leader Megawati Sukarnoputri by Soeryadi at the party's 1996 Medan conference, the PDI tried hard to put forward an independent image. Meanwhile, many of Megawati's supporters gravitated towards the PPP, in a phenomenon known as the "Mega-Bintang" coalition. Bintang means "star", and was the symbol of the PPP.  This was an entirely unexpected occurrence. Megawati was seen as representing secular politics, while the PPP was an Islamic party, but the two found common ground as a coalition of the oppressed.

PPP officials explicitly rejected the term "coalition", and said the increase in their support was a symbol of the revival of their party. However, posters and symbols carried by Megawati supporters made it clear what the "Mega-Bintang" coalition really meant. The government then banned the use of "Mega-Bintang" posters and symbols, saying it was contrary to election regulation. This ban was used by the security forces as an excuse to remove all such symbols.

Campaign participants

According to Kristiadi, there were three types of people who took part in the campaigns:

 People ordered to do so or who were after money, or who wanted to see the entertainers laid on at rallies
 People who voluntarily attended because they were proud to support their organisation
 Young people releasing energy

More than 200 people died during the course of the campaign, mostly in road traffic accidents and through being trapped in burning buildings during the disturbances in Banjarmasin.

Intimidation and other irregularities

There were reports in the press of intimidation and “buying support”, for example pressure on teachers to urge older high school students (the minimum voting age was 18) to vote for "a particular election participant"  with a 'reward' for compliance and 'punishment' for failure. There were also other reports of known PPP and PDI supporters being intimidated.

There were also disputes between employees, who wanted voters to cast their ballots at their places of work, and local government officials, who wanted them to vote near their homes, as each wanted to ensure they met their responsibility to achieve their quota of Golkar votes.

Results
While Golkar won 282 seats in the MPR, the PDI lost 45 (winning 56 seats) while the PPP, thanks in part to the pro-Megawati PDI wing support, won 62 seats, an increase of 27.

By province

1998 indirect presidential election

Following the legislative election, on 10 March 1998, an indirect presidential election took place that saw president Suharto be re-elected unanimously to a seventh term by the People's Consultative Assembly along with new Vice-President BJ Habibie. Despite the election, which took place during the height of the 1998 financial crisis, Suharto was forced to resign that May, just two months into what was to have been a five-year term.

Notes

References

Sources

 Nohlen, Dieter, Grotz, Florian & Hartmann, Christof (2001) Elections in Asia: A data handbook, Volume II 

Legislative elections in Indonesia
Indonessia
New Order (Indonesia)
Legislative
People's Consultative Assembly